Miroslav König (born 1 June 1972) is a retired Slovak football goalkeeper of German descent, who played during the 1990s and 2000s. He played for a number of clubs in Slovakia, Switzerland, Turkey, the Czech Republic and Greece.

Career
König began his career with FC Nitra in 1991 but never played any games at the club and moved to FC Spartak Trnava in 1993. He impressed during his two season at Spartak and was noticed by ŠK Slovan Bratislava whom he signed for in 1995. He went on to play over 100 matches for Slovan over five seasons and earned his place in the Slovak national team. In 2000, he signed for Swiss giants Grasshopper Club Zürich but failed to make his mark in the first-team and left to join rivals FC Basel he played just one season and went on to play for FC Concordia Basel on loan and FC Zürich before leaving Switzerland for Turkey's Elazığspor in 2003. The Czech Republic was König's next destination as he signed for FC Baník Ostrava in 2004 before returning to Slovakia with MŠK Žilina in 2005. Greek side Panionios F.C. signed him in 2006 and he retired in the Summer of 2008 after making 31 appearances for the club, at the age of 36.

König was capped 43 times by the Slovak national team between 1997 and 2004.

Honours
Slovan Bratislava
 Slovak League Winner: 3
 1995, 1996, 1999

 Slovak Cup Winner: 2
 1997, 1999

 Slovak Super Cup Winner: 2
 1995, 1996

 Ciudad de Cartagena Trophy Winner: 1
 1996

MŠK Žilina
 Slovak League Runner-Up: 1
 2005

References

External links 
 
 
 

1972 births
Living people
Slovak footballers
Slovak expatriate footballers
Slovak expatriate sportspeople in Switzerland
FC Nitra players
FC Spartak Trnava players
ŠK Slovan Bratislava players
MŠK Žilina players
FC Zürich players
FC Basel players
Grasshopper Club Zürich players
FC Concordia Basel players
Slovakia international footballers
Czech First League players
FC Baník Ostrava players
Panionios F.C. players
Elazığspor footballers
Slovak people of German descent
Slovak expatriate sportspeople in Turkey
Slovak Super Liga players
Süper Lig players
Super League Greece players
Swiss Super League players
Sportspeople from Nitra
Association football goalkeepers